1780 Kippes, provisional designation , is an Eoan asteroid from the outer regions of the asteroid belt, approximately 28 kilometers in diameter. It was discovered on 12 September 1906, by astronomer August Kopff at the Heidelberg-Königstuhl State Observatory in southwest Germany. The asteroid was named after German Catholic priest and amateur astronomer Otto Kippes.

Orbit and classification 

Kippes is a member the Eos family, the largest asteroid family of the outer main belt consisting of nearly 10,000 asteroids. It orbits the Sun in the outer main-belt at a distance of 2.9–3.2 AU once every 5 years and 3 months (1,914 days). Its orbit has an eccentricity of 0.05 and an inclination of 9° with respect to the ecliptic.

The body's observation arc begins at Heidelberg in 1906, one week after its official discovery observation.

Physical characteristics 

Kippes is an assumed S-type asteroid, while the overall spectral type of the Eos family is that of a K-type.

Rotation period 

In July 1984, a rotational lightcurve of Kippes was obtained from photometric observations by astronomer Richard P. Binzel at the CTIO and McDonald Observatory. Lightcurve analysis gave a rotation period of 18.0 hours with a brightness amplitude of 0.23 magnitude.

Diameter and albedo 

According to the surveys carried out by the Infrared Astronomical Satellite IRAS, the Japanese Akari satellite and the NEOWISE mission of NASA's Wide-field Infrared Survey Explorer, Kippes measures between 25.77 and 31.262 kilometers in diameter  and its surface has an albedo between 0.0966 and 0.143.

The Collaborative Asteroid Lightcurve Link adopts the results obtained by IRAS, that is, an albedo of 0.1212 and a diameter of 27.92 kilometers based on an absolute magnitude of 10.68.

Naming 

This minor planet was named after German Catholic priest and amateur astronomer Otto Kippes (1905–1994). He was a precise observer, acknowledged for his orbit calculations and identifications of hundreds of minor planets in widely separated oppositions. The official  was published by the Minor Planet Center on 15 June 1973.

References

External links 
 Asteroid Lightcurve Database (LCDB), query form (info )
 Dictionary of Minor Planet Names, Google books
 Asteroids and comets rotation curves, CdR – Observatoire de Genève, Raoul Behrend
 Discovery Circumstances: Numbered Minor Planets (1)-(5000) – Minor Planet Center
 
 

001780
Discoveries by August Kopff
Named minor planets
19060912